Costa Nhamoinesu (born 6 January 1986) is a Zimbabwean professional footballer who plays as a centre-back. 

He started his senior career with Masvingo United. In 2008, he moved to Poland joining lower-league club KS Wisła Ustronianka on a half-year loan. He switched to Zagłębie Lubin on a two-year loan before signing permanently for Zagłębie Lubin in 2010. In 2013 he signed for Sparta Prague. After spending seven years there, he left the club in 2020 and joined Indian Super League club Kerala Blasters FC.

Early life
Costa was born in Harare and was raised both in the city by his parents, and in the countryside with his grandparents. His parents' home did not have enough room for him to live there permanently, however, so he was forced to stay with friends and other relatives around the city. While at middle school he started playing football for a club which paid his education fees and accommodation.

Club career

Early career
While playing in the Zimbabwean first league for Masvingo United, Nhamoinesu was spotted by an agent who sent him to Poland, where he began playing for 5th division amateur side KS Wisła Ustroniaka.

Zagłębie Lubin
In July 2008, he joined Zagłębie Lubin on loan, before signing permanently in 2010. While at Lubin, he became one of the most highly rated left-backs in the Polish league.

Sparta Prague
In 2013, seeking an exit from Poland, he signed a deal with Czech side AC Sparta Prague. He had also received offers from Russia, Germany and Turkey. He made his league debut for Sparta Prague on 21 July 2013 in a 4–1 away victory over Vysočina Jihlava. His first league goal for the club came on 31 August 2013 in a 4–1 home win over Baník Ostrava. The goal, scored in the 64th minute, made up for the own goal that he had scored in the 26th.

In July 2020, it was announced Nhamoinesu would leave the club after the club had decided not to renew the contract of the 34-year-old. He spent seven years with Sparta Prague. He was the first African player to captain the Czech side.

Kerala Blasters
On 10 October 2020, it was officially announced that Nhamoinesu joined the Indian Super League side Kerala Blasters FC on a one-year deal. By signing for the Blasters, he became the first Zimbabwe player to represent the club. On 18 November 2020, he was appointed as one of the captain ahead of the club's new season. He made his debut for the Blasters on 20 November 2020 in match against ATK Mohun Bagan where the Blasters suffered a 1–0 loss. On 10 January 2021, he scored his first goal for the club against Jamshedpur FC in which Blasters won 3–2. On 11 June, Nhamoinesu's exit from the club was announced.

TS Podbeskidzie
In July 2021, Nhamoinesu joined the Podbeskidzie Bielsko-Biała in the I liga. He left the club on 24 January 2022, citing personal reasons.

International career
Nhamoinesu represented the Zimbabwe national team, for whom he made 11 appearances. On 20 October 2012, he was among those exonerated from a lifetime ban imposed on many Zimbabwean internationals for match fixing. Nhamoinesu scored his first goal for Zimbabwe on 28 March 2016 against Swaziland in a 2017 Africa Cup of Nations qualifier.

Career statistics

Club

International goals

Scores and results list Zimbabwe's goal tally first, score column indicates score after each Nhamoinesu goal.

Honours
Masvingo United
 Zimbabwean Independence Trophy: 2006, 2007

Sparta Prague
 Czech First League: 2013–14
 Czech Cup: 2013–14, 2019–20
 Czech Supercup: 2014

References

External links
 
 
 

1986 births
Living people
Sportspeople from Harare
Zimbabwean footballers
Association football defenders
Zimbabwe international footballers
2017 Africa Cup of Nations players
Amazulu F.C. (Zimbabwe) players
Masvingo United F.C. players
Zagłębie Lubin players
AC Sparta Prague players
Kerala Blasters FC players
Podbeskidzie Bielsko-Biała players
Czech First League players
Ekstraklasa players
I liga players
Zimbabwean expatriate footballers
Zimbabwean expatriate sportspeople in Poland
Expatriate footballers in Poland
Zimbabwean expatriate sportspeople in the Czech Republic
Expatriate footballers in the Czech Republic
Expatriate footballers in India